The 1997 Red Band World Darts Championship was held between 29 December 1996 and 5 January 1997 at the Circus Tavern in Purfleet, Essex. It was the fourth World Championship organised by the World Darts Council, which had acrimoniously split from the British Darts Organisation in 1992–93. As a result of an ongoing legal battle, this would be the last time that the WDC name would be used – an out-of-court settlement (Tomlin Order) in June 1997 meant that the organisation had to change its name to the Professional Darts Corporation (PDC).

Paul Lim, who famously hit a nine dart finish at the 1990 Embassy Championship appeared at his first WDC World Championship – he had only managed to qualify once for the Embassy since the split, losing a second round match to John Part in 1994.

The Championship saw two tight semi-finals, the most memorable of which was the clash between mentor and protégé – Eric Bristow and Phil Taylor. Taylor emerged victorious 5–4 in sets to reach the final. He matched his mentor's feat of five World Championship titles when he beat Dennis Priestley 6–3 in the final. They were now level as the most successful players of all-time.

Seeds
 Dennis Priestley
 Phil Taylor
 Bob Anderson
 Peter Evison
 Jamie Harvey
 Alan Warriner
 Keith Deller
 Rod Harrington

Prize money
The prize fund was £99,500.

Results

Preliminary round
A best of five sets preliminary round match took place between Tom Kirby, Peter Manley, Ritchie Gardner, Paul Lim, Chris Mason and Dave Kelly, as they were tied on the rankings.

Group stage

Group A

Bristow qualified with a higher tournament average.

29 December–1 January

Group B

29 December–1 January

Group C

29 December–1 January

Group D

29 December–1 January

Group E

29 December–1 January

Group F

29 December–1 January

Group G

29 December–1 January

Group H

29 December–1 January

Knockout stages

Third place play-off:  (4) Peter Evison 83.25 4 – 2  Eric Bristow 83.23

Representation from different countries
This table shows the number of players by country in the World Championship. Four countries were represented in the World Championship, one less than in the previous championship.

References 

PDC World Darts Championships
WDC World Darts Championship 1997
WDC World Darts Championship
WDC World Darts Championship
WDC World Darts Championship
WDC World Darts Championship
WDC World Darts Championship
Purfleet
Sport in Essex